A by-election was held for the Australian House of Representatives seat of Parramatta on 22 September 1973. The by-election was triggered by the resignation of former Liberal Party long-serving Attorney General and Minister for Foreign Affairs, the Honourable (and later Sir) Nigel Bowen who accepted an appointment to the NSW Court of Appeal.

The seat was retained by the Liberal Party, with Philip Ruddock defeating Michael Whelan, who contested the seat for the Labor Party. Ten other candidates from minor parties contested the seat.

This was the first federal election in which eighteen-year-olds were eligible to vote, the voting age having been lowered from twenty-one earlier in the year.

Results

See also
 List of Australian federal by-elections

References

1973 elections in Australia
New South Wales federal by-elections
September 1973 events in Australia
1970s in New South Wales